The 2nd Rhode Island Cavalry Regiment was a cavalry regiment of the Union Army in the American Civil War.

Service
The 2nd Rhode Island Cavalry Regiment was organized in Providence, Rhode Island and mustered in November 21, 1862, for a three-year enlistment.  The regiment never reached full strength.

The regiment was attached to 1st Division, XIX Corps, Department of the Gulf, to July 1863. Cavalry Brigade, XIX Corps, to August 1863.

Ordered to New Orleans, Louisiana, and served duty there until March 1863.  Moved to Baton Rouge, Louisiana, March 6–7, 1863.  Participated in the operations against Port Hudson, March 7–27.  Moved to Algiers, then to Berwick April 1–9.  Operations in western Louisiana April 9-May 14.  Teche Campaign April 11–20.  Franklin April 14.  Near Washington May 1.  Expedition from Opelousas to Alexandria and Simsport May 5–18.  Operations about Monett's Plantation and on Bayou Sara Road May 18–19.  Moved to Bayou Sara, then to Port Hudson May 22–25.  Siege of Port Hudson May 25-July 9. Jackson Cross Roads June 20.  Springfield Landing July 2. Surrender of Port Hudson July 9.

The regiment was first consolidated into a battalion of four companies August 24, 1863, and attached to the 1st Louisiana Cavalry.  It served thus at Camp Hubbard, Thibodeaux, August 29–30 and then ceased to exist on January 14, 1864, when its members were transferred to the 3rd Rhode Island Cavalry.

Casualties
The regiment lost a total of 35 enlisted men during service; 4 enlisted men killed or mortally wounded, 31 enlisted men died of disease.

Commanders
 Lieutenant Colonel Augustus W. Corliss

See also

 List of Rhode Island Civil War units
 Rhode Island in the American Civil War

References

 Dyer, Frederick H.  A Compendium of the War of the Rebellion (Des Moines, Iowa:  Dyer Pub. Co.), 1908.
 Sabre, Gilbert E. Nineteen Months a Prisoner of War:  Narrative of Lieutenant G. E. Sabre, Second Rhode Island Cavalry, of His Experience in the War Prisons and Stockades of Morton, Mobile, Atlanta, Libby, Belle Island, Andersonville, Macon, Charleston, and Columbia, and His Escape to the Union Lines, to Which is Appended a List of Officers Confined at Columbia, During the Winter of 1864 and 1865 (New York:  American News Co.), 1865.
Attribution
 

Military units and formations established in 1862
Military units and formations disestablished in 1864
2nd Rhode Island Cavalry
1862 establishments in Rhode Island